This is a list of Terminalia species, trees in the family Combretaceae. The list follows Plants of the World Online, which recognised 282 accepted species :

Terminalia actinophylla 
Terminalia acuminata 
Terminalia adamantium 
Terminalia adenopoda 
Terminalia albida 
Terminalia amazonia 
Terminalia anisoptera 
Terminalia ankaranensis 
Terminalia anogeissiana 
Terminalia apetala 
Terminalia arbuscula 
Terminalia archboldiana 
Terminalia archipelagi 
Terminalia arenicola 
Terminalia argentea 
Terminalia aridicola 
Terminalia arjuna 
Terminalia aroldoi 
Terminalia arostrata 
Terminalia aubletii 
Terminalia australis 
Terminalia avicapitis 
Terminalia avicennioides 
Terminalia barbosae 
Terminalia basilei 
Terminalia beccarii 
Terminalia belini 
Terminalia bellirica 
Terminalia bentii 
Terminalia bentzoe 
Terminalia bialata 
Terminalia bipleura 
Terminalia boivinii 
Terminalia brachystemma 
Terminalia brassii 
Terminalia brevipes 
Terminalia brownii 
Terminalia buceras 
Terminalia bucidoides 
Terminalia burmanica 
Terminalia bursarina 
Terminalia calamansanai 
Terminalia calcicola 
Terminalia calogemma 
Terminalia calophylla 
Terminalia cambodiana 
Terminalia camuxa 
Terminalia canaliculata 
Terminalia canescens 
Terminalia capitanea 
Terminalia capitulata 
Terminalia carolinensis 
Terminalia catappa 
Terminalia celebica 
Terminalia cephalota 
Terminalia chebula 
Terminalia cherrieri 
Terminalia citrina 
Terminalia clemensae 
Terminalia complanata 
Terminalia congesta 
Terminalia coronata 
Terminalia corrugata 
Terminalia corticosa 
Terminalia costaricensis 
Terminalia crassipes 
Terminalia creaghii 
Terminalia crebrifolia 
Terminalia crenata 
Terminalia crispialata 
Terminalia cunninghamii 
Terminalia cyanocarpa 
Terminalia darfeuillana 
Terminalia darlingii 
Terminalia densiflora 
Terminalia dhofarica 
Terminalia dichotoma 
Terminalia diptera 
Terminalia disjuncta 
Terminalia divaricata 
Terminalia diversipilosa 
Terminalia domingensis 
Terminalia duckei 
Terminalia eddowesii 
Terminalia eichleriana 
Terminalia elliptica 
Terminalia engleri 
Terminalia erici-rosenii 
Terminalia eriostachya 
Terminalia erythrocarpa 
Terminalia exelliana 
Terminalia exsculpta 
Terminalia fagifolia 
Terminalia fanshawei 
Terminalia fatraea 
Terminalia ferdinandiana 
Terminalia fitzgeraldii 
Terminalia flavicans 
Terminalia foetidissima 
Terminalia franchetii 
Terminalia gatopensis 
Terminalia gazensis 
Terminalia glabrata 
Terminalia glabrescens 
Terminalia glaucifolia 
Terminalia gossweileri 
Terminalia gracilipes 
Terminalia gracilis 
Terminalia grandiflora 
Terminalia grandis 
Terminalia griffithsiana 
Terminalia guaiquinimae 
Terminalia guyanensis 
Terminalia habeensis 
Terminalia hadleyana 
Terminalia harmandii 
Terminalia hoehneana 
Terminalia hylobates 
Terminalia hylodendron 
Terminalia hypargyrea 
Terminalia impediens 
Terminalia ivorensis 
Terminalia januarensis 
Terminalia kaernbachii 
Terminalia kaiseriana 
Terminalia kajewskii 
Terminalia kanchii 
Terminalia kangeanensis 
Terminalia katikii 
Terminalia kilimandscharica 
Terminalia kjellbergii 
Terminalia kleinii 
Terminalia kuhlmannii 
Terminalia kumpaja 
Terminalia laeteviridis 
Terminalia latifolia 
Terminalia latipes 
Terminalia laxiflora 
Terminalia leandriana 
Terminalia leiocarpa 
Terminalia litoralis 
Terminalia longespicata 
Terminalia lucida 
Terminalia lundquistii 
Terminalia luteola 
Terminalia macadamii 
Terminalia macrantha 
Terminalia macrophylla 
Terminalia macroptera 
Terminalia macrostachya 
Terminalia maestrensis 
Terminalia mameluco 
Terminalia mantaliopsis 
Terminalia mantaly 
Terminalia maoi 
Terminalia megalocarpa 
Terminalia megalophylla 
Terminalia melanocarpa 
Terminalia menezesii 
Terminalia microcarpa 
Terminalia modesta 
Terminalia molii 
Terminalia molinetii 
Terminalia mollis 
Terminalia morobensis 
Terminalia muelleri 
Terminalia myanmarensis 
Terminalia myriocarpa 
Terminalia myrtifolia 
Terminalia narnorokensis 
Terminalia neglecta 
Terminalia neotaliala 
Terminalia nigrovenulosa 
Terminalia nipensis 
Terminalia nitens 
Terminalia nitidissima 
Terminalia novocaledonica 
Terminalia obidensis 
Terminalia oblonga 
Terminalia oblongata 
Terminalia ochroprumna 
Terminalia oliveri 
Terminalia ombrophila 
Terminalia orbicularis 
Terminalia oreadum 
Terminalia orientensis 
Terminalia oryzetorum 
Terminalia oxycarpa 
Terminalia oxyphylla 
Terminalia pachystyla 
Terminalia pallida 
Terminalia pallidovirens 
Terminalia paniculata 
Terminalia papuana 
Terminalia parvifolia 
Terminalia parvula 
Terminalia pedicellata 
Terminalia pellucida 
Terminalia pendula 
Terminalia pennyana 
Terminalia perrieri 
Terminalia petiolaris 
Terminalia phaeocarpa 
Terminalia phanerophlebia 
Terminalia phellocarpa 
Terminalia phillyreifolia 
Terminalia plagata 
Terminalia platyphylla 
Terminalia platyptera 
Terminalia polyantha 
Terminalia polycarpa 
Terminalia porphyrocarpa 
Terminalia procera 
Terminalia prostrata 
Terminalia prunioides 
Terminalia psilantha 
Terminalia pteleopsoides 
Terminalia pterocarpa 
Terminalia pterocarya 
Terminalia pulcherrima 
Terminalia quintalata 
Terminalia ramatuella 
Terminalia randii 
Terminalia reitzii 
Terminalia rerei 
Terminalia rhopalophora 
Terminalia richii 
Terminalia riedelii 
Terminalia rivularis 
Terminalia rostrata 
Terminalia rubiginosa 
Terminalia rubricarpa 
Terminalia rufovestita 
Terminalia sambesiaca 
Terminalia samoensis 
Terminalia schimperiana 
Terminalia scutifera 
Terminalia sepicana 
Terminalia septentrionalis 
Terminalia sericea 
Terminalia seyrigii 
Terminalia shankarraoi 
Terminalia × silozensis 
Terminalia simulans 
Terminalia slooteniana 
Terminalia soembawana 
Terminalia solomonensis 
Terminalia spinosa 
Terminalia steenisiana 
Terminalia stenostachya 
Terminalia strigillosa 
Terminalia stuhlmannii 
Terminalia suaveolens 
Terminalia subacroptera 
Terminalia subserrata 
Terminalia subspathulata 
Terminalia sulcata 
Terminalia superba 
Terminalia supitiana 
Terminalia supranitifolia 
Terminalia surigaensis 
Terminalia tetrandra 
Terminalia tetraphylla 
Terminalia tetraptera 
Terminalia travancorensis 
Terminalia trichopoda 
Terminalia tricristata 
Terminalia triflora 
Terminalia tristis 
Terminalia tropophylla 
Terminalia uleana 
Terminalia ulexoides 
Terminalia urschii 
Terminalia valverdeae 
Terminalia vermae 
Terminalia virens 
Terminalia viridiflora 
Terminalia vitiensis 
Terminalia welwitschii
Terminalia whitmorei 
Terminalia yapacana 
Terminalia zeylanica 
Terminalia zollingeri

References 

List
Terminalia (plant)